Petrovskoye is an urban locality (a work settlement) in Rostovsky District of Yaroslavl Oblast, Russia, situated on a major highway leading from Moscow to the Russian North, about halfway between the towns of Rostov and Pereslavl-Zalessky. Population:

History
It was first mentioned in a chronicle at 1207. It was granted a town status and renamed Petrovsk in 1777. By the mid-20th century the settlement declined, was demoted in status to that of a rural locality and renamed Petrovskoye. It was granted urban-type settlement status in 1943.

References

Urban-type settlements in Yaroslavl Oblast
Rostovsky Uyezd (Yaroslavl Governorate)